The Ninth Federal Electoral District of the Federal District (IX Distrito Electoral Federal del Distrito Federal) is one of the 300 Electoral Districts into which Mexico is divided for the purpose of elections to the federal Chamber of Deputies and one of 27 such districts in the Federal District ("DF" or Mexico City).

It elects one deputy to the lower house of Congress for each three-year legislative period, by means of the first past the post system.

District territory
Under the 2005 districting scheme, the DF's Ninth District covers the western portion of the borough (delegación) of Venustiano Carranza.

Previous districting schemes

1996–2005 district
Between 1996 and 2005, the Ninth District covered the same basic area, with a slight reduction in its size.

Deputies returned to Congress from this district

XLIII Legislature
1955–1958: Manuel Sierra Macedo (PAN)
XLVII Legislature
1967–1970: Javier Blanco Sanchez (PAN)
XLVIII Legislature
1970–1973:
XLIX Legislature
1973–1976:
L Legislature
1976–1979: Venustiano Reyes López (PRI)
LI Legislature
1979–1982: Gonzalo Castellot Madrazo (PRI)
LII Legislature
1982–1985: Arturo Contreras Cuevas (PRI)
LIII Legislature
1985–1988:
LIV Legislature
1988–1991: Magdaleno Gutiérrez Herrera (PAN)
LV Legislature
1991–1994:
LVI Legislature
1994–1997: Irma Eugenia Cedillo y Amador (PRI)
LVII Legislature
1997–2000: Victorio Montalvo Rojas (PRD)
LVIII Legislature
2000–2003: Daniel Ramírez del Valle (PAN)
LIX Legislature
2003–2006: María Guadalupe Morales Rubio (PRD)
LX Legislature
2006–2009: Victorio Montalvo Rojas (PRD)

References and notes

Federal electoral districts of Mexico
Mexico City